Crookston High School is a public high school located in Crookston, Minnesota, United States. The school, a part of Crookston School District 593, serves about 600 students in grades 7 through 12. There are 7 hours a day, with each class taking up to 55 minutes. School starts at 8:20 AM and ends at 3:15 PM.

References

External links 
 

Crookston, Minnesota
Educational institutions established in 1914
Public high schools in Minnesota
High schools in Minnesota
Schools in Polk County, Minnesota
Public middle schools in Minnesota
1914 establishments in Minnesota